Cerkiewnik  is a village in the administrative district of Gmina Dobre Miasto, within Olsztyn County, Warmian-Masurian Voivodeship, in northern Poland.

The village has a population of 429.

References

Cerkiewnik